Terminalia avicennioides is a tree species in the genus Terminalia found in West Africa.

Castalagin and flavogallonic acid dilactone are hydrolysable tannins found in T. avicennoides.

See also
 Bògòlanfini, a handmade Malian cotton fabric dyed yellow in wool solution, made from the leaves of T. avicennoides

References

External links

avicennioides
Plants described in 1832